Essence Music is an independent record label based in Juiz de Fora, Brazil. All the albums are released in a standard edition and a special edition, which is a hand-made box including the standard edition of the album, various inserts, and usually a bonus disc.

Artists

References

External links
 Essence Music official website
 

Brazilian independent record labels
Ambient music record labels
Experimental music record labels
Noise music record labels
Psychedelic rock record labels
Record labels established in 2003